Joseph or Joe Walters may refer to:

Joe Walters (born 1984), American lacrosse player
Joe Walters (English footballer) (1886–1923), English football player (Aston Villa, Oldham Athletic)
Joe Walters (Scottish footballer) (1935–2017), Scottish football player (Clyde FC)
Joe Walters (cricketer) (born 1940), English cricket player (Nottinghamshire)
Joseph Walters (politician) (fl. 1916–1920), member of the 14th Parliament of British Columbia